Sithōnes is the name of a Thracian tribe.

See also
 Thracian tribes

References

Ancient tribes in Thrace
Thracian tribes